Handy Manny is a CGI-animated children's television series produced by Nelvana. The series premiered on September 16, 2006, originally as part of Disney Channel's Playhouse Disney daily block intended for preschoolers. On February 14, 2011, it was moved to the Disney Junior block, which served as Playhouse Disney's replacement. The series' final episode aired on February 14, 2013.

Series overview

Episodes
The episodes are listed in order of production.

Season 1 (2006–2007)

Season 2 (2007–2009)

Season 3 (2009–2013)

Handy Manny's School for Tools

References

Lists of American children's animated television series episodes
Lists of Canadian children's animated television series episodes